Dark Stars is a 1980 board game published by Simulations Canada.

Gameplay
Dark Stars is a game of exploration and colonization that takes place in a globular cluster and involves the rivalry between three native races and the intruding Terrans.

Reception
William A. Barton reviewed Dark Stars in The Space Gamer No. 42. Barton commented that "Overall, while Dark Stars might prove a moderately interesting diversion for those who don't mind having to improvise a bit on rules and who wish a change from Stellar Conquest or other such games, its faults, coupled with its overinflated [...] price tag, are enough that most gamers should be advised to look elsewhere."

Steve List reviewed Dark Stars in Ares Magazine #8 and commented that "the game is only half-cooked. The essential idea behind it is good and parts of the design are very nice, but on the whole it is underdeveloped and not terribly well produced as a physical artifact. If you like to tinker with game designs, but it, for you're sure to find lots of things to elaborate on. However, if you want a complete product, look elsewhere."

Eric Goldberg reviewed Dark Stars in Ares Magazine #8 and commented that "Dark Stars is essentially a simple, time-consuming, solitaire exercise. Interplayer contact is discouraged by the system, which makes sense in light of the rationale. I cannot say the game is very rewarding face-to-face, but it should be an excellent play-by-mail vehicle."

References

Board games introduced in 1980
Simulations Canada games